Tell Mannas, sometimes spelled Telminnes, Tal Minnis, Talmanis, Talmanes or Telmans, is a village  east of Maarrat al-Nu'man. The village is administratively a part of the Maarrat al-Nu'man District in the Idlib Governorate. According to the Syria Central Bureau of Statistics (CBS), Tell Mannas had a population of 11,359 in the 2004 census.

History
During the late Umayyad period, the olive groves of Tall Mannas were used by the troops of Caliph Marwan II to ambush the rebel Umayyad prince Sulayman ibn Hisham as he passed through the area. In the early 9th century, Tall Mannas was controlled by the Tanukhids under their chieftain al-Hawari ibn Hittin, during their rebellion against the Abbasid princely family, the Banu Salih. Tall Mannas was used a residence by the Abbasid caliph al-Mutawakkil when he visited the area in 858. It was described by local geographer Yaqut al-Hamawi as a fortress near Ma'arrat al-Nu'man. 

In 1079, the Tutush I of Damascus besieged but failed to capture Tall Mannas during his campaign in northern Syria. Later, in 1098/97 Tall Mannas was inhabited by Christian community of Oriental Orthodox Syriacs and its inhabitants gave safe haven and assistance to the Crusaders under Raymond Pilet of Antioch during their failed siege of Ma'arrat al-Nu'man. Some months later, Ma'arrat al-Nu'man was captured and its entire population massacred by the Crusaders.

References

Bibliography

Populated places in Maarat al-Numan District